Angelo Cesi (1530–1606) was a Roman Catholic prelate who served as Bishop of Todi (1566–1606).

Cesi was born in Rome, Italy in 1530. On 15 February 1566, he was appointed at the age of 36 years as Bishop of Todi during the papacy of Pope Pius V. On 31 March 1566, he was consecrated bishop by Giulio Gentile, Bishop of Vulturara e Montecorvino, with Bernardino de Cupis, Bishop of Osimo, and Ippolito Arrivabene, Bishop Emeritus of Hierapetra, serving as co-consecrators. He served as Bishop of Todi for 40 years until his death on 30 November 1606 in Todi, Italy.

While bishop, Cesi was the principal co-consecrator of Ottavio Santacroce, Bishop of Cervia (1576); and Pietro Francesco Montorio, Bishop of Nicastro (1594).

In Todi, the bishop was active in construction of a number of architectural projects. Cesi was buried in his family's chapel built into the apse of the Todi Cathedral.

References

External links and additional sources
 (for Chronology of Bishops) 
 (for Chronology of Bishops) 

16th-century Italian Roman Catholic bishops
17th-century Italian Roman Catholic bishops
Bishops appointed by Pope Pius V
1530 births
1606 deaths
Clergy from Rome